Risso may refer to:

 Risso, Uruguay
 Antoine Risso (1777–1845), French naturalist
 Risso's dolphin, a species of dolphin named by Antoine Risso
 Eduardo Risso (born 1961), Argentine comic book artist
 Eduardo Risso (rower) (born 1925), Uruguayan rower